Anolis australis, the southern stout anole, is a species of lizard in the family Dactyloidae. It is endemic to southern Hispaniola and is found in both the Dominican Republic and Haiti.

References

Anoles
Lizards of the Caribbean
Endemic fauna of Hispaniola
Reptiles of the Dominican Republic
Reptiles of Haiti
Reptiles described in 2019
Taxa named by Stephen Blair Hedges
Taxa named by Gunther Köhler
Taxa named by Kathleen McGrath (herpetologist)
Taxa named by Caroline Zimmer